Opsirhina is a genus of moths in the family Lasiocampidae. It was erected by Francis Walker in 1855. All species in the genus were described from Australia.

Species
Based on Lepidoptera and Some Other Life Forms:
Opsirhina alphaea (Fabricius, 1775)
Opsirhina albigutta Walker, 1855
Opsirhina lechriodes (Turner, 1911)

References

Lasiocampidae